The Canberra Express was an Australian passenger train operated by the State Rail Authority between Sydney and Canberra via the Main South line from May 1982 until January 1994.

It was introduced in May 1982 being operated by DEB railcar sets. In August 1983 it was converted to XPT operation and renamed the Canberra XPT. In February 1990 the XPT was replaced by HUB/RUB rolling stock. 

It ceased in January 1994 following the introduction of Xplorers to the route.

References

Named passenger trains of Australia
Passenger rail transport in New South Wales
Railway services introduced in 1982
Railway services discontinued in 1994
Transport in the Australian Capital Territory
1982 establishments in Australia
1994 disestablishments in Australia
Discontinued railway services in Australia